Talo'fo'fo, formerly Talofofo, is a village located in the southern part of the United States territory of Guam, on the east coast.  The village center is located in the hills above the coast, while the smaller coastal community below the cliff is known as Ipan. 

The village contains two golf courses. Other tourist attractions include Jeff's Pirate's Cove Restaurant and Museum, Talofofo Caves, Talofofo Falls Resort Park, Ipan Beach Resort and a Talofofo River boat cruise to an ancient Chamorro village.  Japanese holdout from World War II Shoichi Yokoi was discovered by Jesus Duenas and Manuel DeGracia near Talo'fo'fo on January 24, 1972. A recreation of his hide out cave is included at the Talofofo Falls Resort Park.

The village is located south of Yona and north of Inarajan.

Demographics
The U.S. Census Bureau counts the following census-designated places in the municipality: Talofofo, and Ipan.

Education
Guam Public School System serves the island.

Talofofo Elementary School serves elementary school students. Southern High School in Santa Rita serves the village.

Notre Dame High School, a Catholic high school, is in Talo'fo'fo.

Government

Gallery

See also 
 Villages of Guam

References and notes 

 
Census-designated places in Guam